Luka Mrakovčić (born 22 September 1994) is a Croatian handball player who plays for TuS N-Lübbecke and the Croatia national team.

Career
Mrakovčić started his career at youth clubs Pećine and Kozala before joining Premier League club RK Zamet. During his first season he played mostly for the club's second team and won the fourth division league title. During the end of the season he played matches for the senior team. The club has also reached the final of the Croatian Cup but was defeated by defending champions CO Zagreb 23:36.

He became a regular player in the squad of Zamet even playing matches in the EHF Cup. In 2015 Lino Červar called up Mrakovčić to play for Macedonian RK Metalurg Skopje.

Personal life
He has a younger brother Marko who is a handball player at RK Zamet.

Honours
Zamet II
3. HRL - West (2): 2011–12

Zagreb
Premier League: 2016-17, 2017–18, 2018-19
Croatian Cup: 2017, 2018, 2019

References

External links
League stats
European stats

1994 births
Living people
Croatian male handball players
RK Zamet players
RK Zagreb players